Siphlonurus rapidus is a species of primitive minnow mayfly in the family Siphlonuridae. It is found in North America.

References

Siphlonuridae
Articles created by Qbugbot
Insects described in 1924
Insects of North America